Kevin Bartlett (born 20 January 1981) is a retired Barbadian long jumper and sprinter.

In the young age categories, he won several regional medals, including four medals at the 1997 CARIFTA Games, and he finished eleventh at the 2000 World Junior Championships. He later finished eighth at the 2003 Pan American Games. At the 2003 Central American and Caribbean Championships he had less success as he no-marked in the long jump final, and reached the 100 metres semifinal.

He became Barbadian champion several times. His personal best jump was 7.85 metres indoor, achieved in January 2002 in Joplin. Outdoors he only had 7.67 metres, achieved in 2000. His personal best jump is the Barbadian indoor record.

References

1981 births
Living people
Barbadian long jumpers
Barbadian male sprinters
Athletes (track and field) at the 2003 Pan American Games
Pan American Games competitors for Barbados